Isabel Le Brun de Pinochet (born 1845, in San Felipe, Chile – flourished 1870s), was a Chilean educationalist who led reform of education for girls in Chile. 

In her time secondary education for girls was limited and only available through the church. Pinochet opened a private secondary school, later known as Liceo Isabel Le Brun de Pinochet, in Santiago in 1875. This paved the way for a state-funded educational system for both sexes. She not only gave primary instruction, but she also taught secondary school. At the end of the second year of the schools functioning, on December 1, 1876, she decided to send a request to the University Council to ask for the nomination of university commissions to assist to and validate her students' exams. 

Due to her lobbying a decree facilitating the admittance of women to higher education was signed by Miguel Luis Amunátegui, Minister of Education, in 1877. 

A statue to her and fellow women's educationalist Antonia Tarrago by Samuel Román Rocías stands in Santiago de Chile.

Notes

References
 Women in Brazil & Chile at Babson College, located in Wellesley, Massachusetts  Powerpoint. Accessed June 2008
The entry of Chilean women in university and the changes in customs through law 1872-1877 by Karin Sánchez Manríquez, Pontificia Universidad Católica de Chile. Accessed June 2008

External links
Photo of statue to Isabel Le Brun de Pinochet in Santiago de Chile. Accessed June 2008

1845 births
Year of death missing
19th-century Chilean women
Chilean educators
Chilean women educators
Chilean people of French descent